Dalkhola railway station is a railway station in Dalkhola, Uttar Dinajpur district, West Bengal, India. It is a standard II-R interlocked roadside station situated on electrified double line section at 43 metres above sea level. It also serves as a prominent rakepoint and the entry to the rest of the NFR. This station lies on Howrah–New Jalpaiguri line, Barauni–Guwahati line and Katihar-Siliguri line under Katihar railway division of Northeast Frontier Railway.

Trains

Major Trains
Sealdah -New Alipurduar Padatik Superfast Express
Dibrugarh-Lalgarh Avadh Assam Express
Sealdah–Agartala Kanchenjunga Express
Sealdah–Silchar Kanchenjunga Express
Barmer–Guwahati Express
Delhi-Kamakhya Brahmaputra Mail
Delhi-Alipurduar Mahananda Express
Sealdah-Alipurduar Kanchan Kanya Express
Kamakhya-Patna Capital Express
Siliguri Junction-Balurghat Express
Siliguri Junction-Katihar Express
New Jalpaiguri-Rajendra Nagar Capital Express
 Bikaner–Guwahati Express
Sealdah-Bamanhat Uttar Banga Express
New Jalpaiguri -Malda Town Express
 New Jalpaiguri–Sitamarhi Weekly Express
Ajmer-Kishanganj Garib Nawaz Express

Gallery

References

External links

Railway stations in Uttar Dinajpur district
Katihar railway division
Railway stations opened in 1871